A gravitic density meter is a type of density meter used in multiple industries to measure the density of a slurry flowing through a pipe line. It consists of a flexible rubber hose that deflects when weight is flowing through the hose. A displacement measurement device, usually a high precision laser or load cell, is used to measure how much change has occurred in the system. 
By calculating the change of deflection of the hose, a gravitic density meter can be used to 
find the real time, continuous density.

Gravitic density meters do not measure the specific gravity directly. The specific gravity is 
calculated after the density has been measured.

Components

A gravitic density meter has multiple components.

A resistance temperature detector (RTD) is used to acquire 
temperature readings. These readings are used to compensate for temperature. A pressure transducer is used to account for changes in pressure. Pressure affects the 
rigidity of the flexible hose. Changes in rigidity affect the way that the flexible hose 
deflects. The flexible hose is used to measure deflection. Larger weights cause more 
deflection in the flexible rubber hose. The flexible hose must be repeatable, accurate, and 
precise. Without these three attributes, an accurate measurement cannot be obtained.

Insulation is used to protect the flexible cartridge as well as isolate the flexible 
cartridge from the effects of ambient temperature. Large differentials between the ambient 
temperature and media temperature cause the flexible cartridge to behave differently than 
what is normal. The displacement measurement device needs to have a fast response time. A 
fast response results in more data which can be used to compensate for vibration. 
Gravitic density meters measure the entire volume inside the flexible cartridge. This makes 
the sample size very large. This large sample size leads to measurements that reflect the 
entire sample, because the entire sample is going to go through the hose.

Industries

Gravitic density meters have many uses in many different industries. Mining, dredging, 
wastewater, paper, and oil and gas all make use of gravitic density meters. All these 
industries need to measure the amount of solids moving through its respective process.

Mining industries use gravitic density meters to measure the amount of ore being transported.

Dredging industries use gravitic density meters to measure the amount of debris being moved 
and carried by the dredge.

Wastewater industries use gravitic density meters to measure the amount of sewage that needs 
to be treated.

Paper production uses gravitic density meters to measure the amount of pulp currently being 
used in the process.

Oil and gas use gravitic density meters to measure the amount of oil and gas in the system. 
This case exemplifies the versatility of gravitic density meters because oil and gas are 
lighter than water.

External links
 White Paper

Density meters